Vasiliy Golovanov (23 December 1960 – 13 April 2021) was a Russian writer and photographer. He was the son of journalist and scientist Yaroslav Golovanov.

Biography
Golovanov attended the Faculty of Journalism at Moscow State University and pursued an early journalistic career, having been published in the magazine Novy Mir. He then authored numerous novels, and received a nomination for the Yuri Kazakov Prize in 2004.

Vasiliy Golovanov died following a long illness on 13 April 2021, at the age of 60.

Publications
Éloge des voyages insensés (2008)
Espaces et Labyrinthes (2013)

References

1960 births
2021 deaths
Russian photographers
Moscow State University alumni
Writers from Moscow